L'Atelier de Joël Robuchon is a three Michelin-starred restaurant in Hong Kong. It is located at Shop 401, The Landmark, Queen's Road Central. The restaurant was run by French celebrity chef Joël Robuchon before his death, it was his fifth L'Atelier restaurant to open, while the head chef is Cattaneo Adriano. Established in 2006, the restaurant was based on his Tokyo restaurant.

Description
The decor of the restaurant has been described as "contemporary chic featuring lush red velvet seating complemented by dark wood furniture." Like the Tokyo restaurant, L'Atelier de Joël Robuchon of Hong Kong is divided into two areas – L'Atelier and Le Jardin. The seats of L'Atelier are in a square around the open kitchen, in a manner similar to a sushi restaurant. The restaurant has an extensive wine collection, and was awarded the Wine Spectator's "Grand Award" in 2010. As of 2020, there are eight L'Atelier de Joël Robuchon restaurants around the world.

History
The restaurant was first announced in March 2006, with the restaurant opening later that year. The restaurant concept was based on his Tokyo edition, established three years earlier. It was his fifth L'Atelier restaurant to open, which means "artist's workshop".

Reception and recognition

 MICHELIN GUIDE HONG KONG & MACAU: Three Star since 2010
 WINE SPECTATOR: Grand Award since 2010
 WORLD OF FINE WINE 2019: Three Star, Best Dessert & Fortified Wine List, Best Long Wine List, Runner-Up Best Champagne & Sparkling Wine List 
 CHINA'S WINE LIST OF THE YEAR: Three Glass Rating since 2013

See also
List of Michelin starred restaurants

References

External links

Official site

Michelin Guide starred restaurants in Hong Kong
2006 establishments in Hong Kong
Restaurants established in 2006
French restaurants in Hong Kong